Ezequiel Alejandro Melillo (born 5 August 1993) is an Argentine professional footballer who plays as an attacking midfielder for Fasano.

Career
Melillo played for the youth system of Boca Juniors, before spending time with the academies of River Plate and Tigre. Melillo applied for Italian citizenship at the age of fifteen, while playing five-a-side football in Bari. He went back to Argentina months later, but returned to Italy after agreeing terms of San Basilio Palestrina. He won promotion from the Eccellenza in his time there, as he also had a trial at Napoli. A return to his homeland came again, as the midfielder played for Racing Club of the Primera División from 2013. Appearances in the 2013–14 campaign against Colón, Estudiantes and Godoy Cruz came.

In 2015, Melillo was loaned to Primera B Nacional's Unión Mar del Plata. Ten matches followed as they suffered relegation, he was notably sent off during his final encounter on 8 November 2015 versus Guillermo Brown. 2016 saw Melillo sign for Eccellenza Sicily side Troina. They, in 2016–17, won a place in the 2017–18 Serie D; where he appeared fifteen times and scored once. On 27 July 2018, Serie C outfit Vibonese signed Melillo. His opening appearances arrived in the succeeding September in fixtures with Bisceglie, Trapani and Catanzaro. Ahead of 2019–20, Melillo joined Messina of Serie D.

After ten appearances for Messina, Melillo headed across Serie D to Savoia; who he'd appear three times for. In February 2021, Melillo joined league rivals Fasano.

Personal life
Melillo was born in Argentina, though his father was born in Salerno, Italy.

Career statistics
.

References

External links

1993 births
Living people
People from San Isidro, Buenos Aires
Argentine sportspeople of Italian descent
Argentine footballers
Association football midfielders
Argentine expatriate footballers
Expatriate footballers in Italy
Argentine expatriate sportspeople in Italy
Eccellenza players
Argentine Primera División players
Primera Nacional players
Serie D players
Serie C players
U.S. Palestrina 1919 players
Racing Club de Avellaneda footballers
Unión de Mar del Plata footballers
U.S. Vibonese Calcio players
S.S.D. F.C. Messina players
U.S. Savoia 1908 players
U.S.D. Città di Fasano players
Sportspeople from Buenos Aires Province